The Crude Oasis is a 1995 American drama film written and directed by Alex Graves. The film stars Jennifer Taylor, Aaron Shields, Robert Peterson, Michael Sibay, Lynn Bieler and Roberta Eaton. The film was released on July 7, 1995, by Miramax Films.

Plot

Cast         
Jennifer Taylor as Karen Webb
Aaron Shields as Harley Underwood
Robert Peterson as Jim Webb
Michael Sibay as The Lover 
Lynn Bieler as Stone
Roberta Eaton as Cheri

References

External links
 

1995 films
American drama films
1995 drama films
Films scored by Steven Bramson
1990s English-language films
1990s American films